Gerald E. Greene (born January 20, 1948) is an American politician from the state of Georgia. He represents the 151st District of the Georgia House of Representatives.

Greene was first elected to the Georgia House in 1982. He was shot behind an adult entertainment store on January 26, 2017, while carrying thousands of dollars of storm relief funds.

References

External links
 Georgia House of Representatives

Living people
Republican Party members of the Georgia House of Representatives
21st-century American politicians
1948 births